Battle of Kyiv or Battle of Kiev may refer to:

 Siege of Kiev (898), by Álmos during the Hungarian migration to the west
 Siege of Kiev (968), by the Pechenigs against the Kievan Rus
 Siege of Kiev (1017), unsuccessful siege by the Pechenigs
 Capture of Kiev (1018)  by Bolesław I the Brave
 Siege of Kiev (1036), defeat of the Pechenigs by Yaroslav the Wise
 Sack of Kiev (1169), by a coalition assembled by Vladimir-Suzdal prince Andrey Bogolyubsky
 Siege of Kiev (1203), by Rurik Rostislavich
 Siege of Kiev (1240), during the Mongol invasion of Rus'
 Sack of Kiev (1299), during the war between Toqta against Nogay and the Polovtsy
 Sack of Kiev (1399), by Temür Qutlugh
 Sack of Kiev (1416), by Edigu against the Grand Duchy of Lithuania
 Sack of Kiev (1482), by Meñli I Giray against the Grand Duchy of Lithuania
 Sack of Kiev (1651), by Janusz Radziwiłł
 Siege of Kiev (1658), unsuccessful siege by Ivan Vyhovsky 
 Kiev Arsenal January Uprising, January 1918
 Battle of Kiev (1918), a February Bolshevik military operation of Petrograd and the Moscow Red Guard against the Rada forces
 Battle of Kiev (January 1919), an offensive by elements of the Ukrainian Front of the Red Army to capture Kiev
 Capture of Kiev by the White Army, August 1919
 Battle of Kiev (December 1919), the third of three battles fought in Kiev in 1919
 Kiev Offensive (1920), part of the Polish-Soviet War
 Battle of Kiev (1941), a major Axis victory over the Soviets during the Second World War
 Battle of Kiev (1943), a Soviet victory in the Second World War
 National Museum-Preserve "Battle for Kyiv 1943", a museum dedicated to the 1943 battle
 Kyiv offensive (2022), a theatre of war in the 2022 Russian invasion of Ukraine
 Battle of Kyiv (2022), a Ukrainian victory over attacking Russian forces during the Kyiv offensive of 2022

See also 
 Kyiv offensive (disambiguation)
 Kiev Bolshevik Uprising, November 1917
 Polish Expedition to Kiev (disambiguation)
 Kyiv (disambiguation)